Adam Krčík (born 16 March 1996) is a Slovak footballer who plays for MFK Skalica as a right-back, on loan from MFK Karviná.

Club career

MFK Tatran Liptovský Mikuláš
Adam Krčík made his Fortuna Liga debut for Tatran Liptovský Mikuláš against Slovan Bratislava on 24 July 2021.

References

External links
 MFK Tatran Liptovský Mikuláš official club profile 
 
 
 Futbalnet profile 
 ÖFB profile 

1996 births
Living people
People from Prievidza
Sportspeople from the Trenčín Region
Slovak footballers
Slovak expatriate footballers
Association football defenders
FK Slovan Duslo Šaľa players
SC Ostbahn XI players
FC Baník Prievidza players
1. SC Znojmo players
MFK Tatran Liptovský Mikuláš players
MFK Karviná players
MFK Skalica players
2. Liga (Slovakia) players
Austrian Landesliga players
3. Liga (Slovakia) players
4. Liga (Slovakia) players
Slovak Super Liga players
Czech National Football League players
Expatriate footballers in Austria
Slovak expatriate sportspeople in Austria
Expatriate footballers in the Czech Republic
Slovak expatriate sportspeople in the Czech Republic